The 17th season of the television series Arthur was originally broadcast on PBS in the United States from November 11, 2013, to May 13, 2014. This season was the second produced by 9 Story Media Group. This is the last season in which Drew Adkins, Jake Beale and Siam Yu voice Arthur, D.W. and The Brain. In the next season, Beale is replaced by Andrew Dayton as D.W., Adkins is replaced by William Healy as Arthur and Yu is replaced by Max Friedman Cole as The Brain.

Episodes

References

External links

Arthur (TV series) seasons
2013 American television seasons
2013 Canadian television seasons